Conasprella subturrita is an extinct species of sea snail, a marine gastropod mollusk in the family Conidae, the cone snails, cone shells or cones.

It is only known as a fossil.

Description

Distribution
This fossil species is known from the Oligocene in France.

References

 Lozouet P. (2017). Les Conoidea de l'Oligocène supérieur (Chattien) du bassin de l'Adour (Sud-Ouest de la France). Cossmanniana. 19: 3-180

subturrita
Gastropods described in 1852